Warburg is a surname. Notable people with the surname include:

Warburg family 
Aby Warburg (1866–1929), German art historian, founder of the Warburg Institute
Mary Warburg (artist) (1866–1934), German artist, wife of Aby Warburg
Gerson Warburg (1765-1826), Hamburg banker
Max Warburg (1867–1946), Hamburg banker
Moses Marcus Warburg (1763-1830), Hamburg banker, founder of M. M. Warburg & Co., Hamburg
Paul Warburg (1868–1932), father of the Federal Reserve
Felix M. Warburg (1871–1937), New York banker
James Warburg (1896–1969), American banker, financial adviser to Franklin D. Roosevelt
Eric M. Warburg (1900–1990), banker and goodwill ambassador, namesake of the Eric M. Warburg Prize
Bettina Warburg (1900–1990), psychiatrist
Siegmund George Warburg (1902–1982), founder of S. G. Warburg & Co., London
Edward Warburg (1908–1992), American philanthropist

German Warburg family 
Emil Warburg (1846–1931), physicist
Otto Warburg (botanist) (1859–1938), German-Jewish botanist
Otto Heinrich Warburg (1883–1970), physiologist, winner of the 1931 Nobel Prize in Physiology or Medicine

Other people 
Carl Warburg (c. 1805–1892), German physician and scientist
Eugene Warburg (1825—1859), African-American sculptor
Agnes Warburg (1872–1953), British photographer
Sydney Warburg (1880–1947), the pen name of an anonymous author who published a book about funding of the Nazi Party by American bankers
Fredric Warburg (1898–1981), publisher, founder of Secker and Warburg
E. F. Warburg (1908–1966), English botanist
Mary Warburg (1908–2009), American philanthropist
Margit Warburg (born 1952), Danish sociologist of religion
Sam Warburg (born 1983), American tennis player
Kai von Warburg (born 1968), German lightweight rower
Otto Warburg (disambiguation)